Jim DeRose (born c. 1967 in Cinnaminson Township, New Jersey) is an American college soccer coach at Bradley University.  He also spent one season as a goalkeeper with the New Mexico Chiles in the American Professional Soccer League.

Player
DeRose attended Johnson State College, playing on the men's soccer team from 1985 to 1988.  He was an NAIA first team All American and the New England Player of the Year in 1988.  He graduated in 1989 with a bachelor's degree in secondary education.  In 1990, DeRose spent one season with the New Mexico Chiles of the American Professional Soccer League.  The Chiles lasted only one season before folding.  During this time, soccer in the United States was experiencing great turbulence.  Teams and leagues lasted a few years at the most before collapsing.  Consequently, DeRose decided to pursue other opportunities in the sport.

Coach
DeRose began his coaching career as an assistant soccer coach at Johnson State College in 1989.  He returned to coaching as an assistant at the University of Vermont in 1991.  In 1992, he moved to Illinois State University where he was an assistant until the school dropped the men's soccer program in 1994.  He spent a single season as an assistant at the University of Richmond before being hired as the head coach at Bradley University in 1996.  In 2007, he was named the Soccer America Magazine Coach of the Year.

DeRose was honored as the Greater Peoria Tri-County Male Coach of the Year in 1998.

References

External links
Bradley University coaching profile

Living people
American soccer coaches
American soccer players
New Mexico Chiles (APSL) players
American Professional Soccer League players
Bradley Braves men's soccer coaches
Johnson State College alumni
People from Cinnaminson Township, New Jersey
Soccer players from New Jersey
Association football goalkeepers
1967 births